The Pinheiros River is a tributary of the Tietê River that runs  through the city of São Paulo, Brazil. Until 1920, the river was known as Jurubatuba. After being channelized its name was changed to Pinheiros. In southern São Paulo the Pinheiros River is impounded in Billings Reservoir.

See also
 Tributaries of the Río de la Plata

References

Rivers of São Paulo (state)
Tributaries of the Tietê